Gonaepa is a genus of moths in the family Gelechiidae.

Species
 Gonaepa actinis Walsingham, 1915
 Gonaepa dysthyma Diakonoff, 1954
 Gonaepa heliarcha (Meyrick, 1886)
 Gonaepa josianella Walker, 1866

References

Gelechiinae